Associazione Calcio Montagnana is an Italian association football club in Montagnana in the Province of Padua. They have played in Serie C and Serie D, but now play in the Prima Categoria.

References

External links 
  

Football clubs in Veneto
Province of Padua
Football clubs in Italy
1915 establishments in Italy
Montagnana